Lake Mohawksin is the name of the reservoir on the Wisconsin River formed by the Tomahawk Dam. The dam is located about one mile south of the city limits of Tomahawk, Wisconsin. Lake Mohawksin was originally called Lake Tomahawk, but the name was changed to avoid confusion with the town of Lake Tomahawk as well as the lake near that town (which is actually called Tomahawk Lake). The name Mohawksin is derived from a concatenation of the last syllables of the three rivers which flow into it – the Somo, the Tomahawk and the Wisconsin.  The name came via a contest won by Herbert Atcherson in 1926.

The lake has an area of 1515 acres, and a maximum depth of 25 feet. There are 6 public boat landings, and the lake features northern pike,  walleyed pike and muskellunge fishing.

The dam is owned by the Wisconsin Public Service Corporation.

See also
List of lakes in Wisconsin

Notes

External links

Wisconsin Department of Natural Resources
Friends of Lake Mohawksin
Wisconsin Public Service Corporation

Bodies of water of Lincoln County, Wisconsin
Reservoirs in Wisconsin